Prokosovići is a village in the municipality of Lukavac, Bosnia and Herzegovina. It is located on the north shore of Modrac Lake.

Demographics 
According to the 2013 census, its population was 1,503.

References

Populated places in Lukavac